Ringette at the 2023 Canada Winter Games took place in Prince Edward Island at the Cavendish Farms Wellness Centre in Montague, and the MacLauchlan Arena in Charlottetown at the University of Prince Edward Island. The event ran from Sunday, February 19, 2023, to Saturday, February 25, 2023.

History
Team P.E.I. (Prince Edward Island) made history after finishing in forth place, having never finished higher than ninth place since the 1991 Canada Winter Games. 
Team P.E.I fell to Team Saskatchewan in the 2023 bronze medal game. The game had been tied at 4-4 until Saskatchewan scored in overtime.

Prior to their historic performance at the 2023 Canada Winter Games (CWG), the team had only won a single game during the 2003 Canada Winter Games in New Brunswick. The Prince Edward Island team came in eighth place during the 1991 Canada Games in Charlottetown, P.E.I., the year which also marked the inaugural inclusion of ringette in the Games competition.

Medallists

Notable players

World Ringette Championships
Erin Ung, Page Roy, Mikyla Brewster, Regan Meier, and Kaylee Armstrong all played for the Under-21 Canada national ringette team at the 2022 World Ringette Championships.

National Ringette League
Team Alberta which finished in second place included both Erin Ung and Mikyla Brewster, players in the 2023–23 National Ringette League from the Calgary RATH.

Team Saskatchewan which finished in third place, included Ally Lenz, Kaitlynn McCaw, Madeline Stang, and Bailey Stangel, all of whom were players from the Saskatchewan Heat.

Team Québec which won the gold medal for the 2023 Canada Winter Games included the following 2022–23 National Ringette League players: Amy Whyte, Maxim Moisan⁣, and Alex Violette⁣ from the Gatineau Fusion, Lauriane Alain⁣, Brittany Lanouette⁣, Caroline Viola, Eléonore Sezia and Laurence Lacombe from the Rive-Sud Révolution, and Annie Trudel, Raphaëlle Chouinard, and Allyson Savoie from the Montreal Mission.

Final standings 
The final standings for the 2023 Canada Winter Games ringette tournament are listed in the table below.

Ringette at the 2019 Canada Winter Games

References

External links
CG Gems Pro

Ringette competitions
2023 Canada Winter Games
Montague, Prince Edward Island